Harvest gold is a shade of orange and yellow.  It was popular with kitchen and other appliances during the 1970s, along with brown, burnt orange, and avocado green.

References 

Shades of yellow